Nehha Pendse (born 29 November 1984) is an Indian film and television actress. She was born and brought up in Mumbai. She made her television debut with Bhagyalakshami and has acted in Hindi, Marathi, Telugu, Tamil and Malayalam films. In 2018, she participated in captivating reality show Bigg Boss 12.

Personal  life
Pendse was born on 29 November 1984 in Mumbai to Vijay Pendse and Shubhangi Pendse. She was brought up in Mumbai and completed her schooling there. Her sister is actress Meenal Pendse.

The actress tied the knot with her boyfriend Shardul Singh Bayas on 5 January 2020. During an interview, Neha revealed that Shardul proposed marriage three months after they started dating, in April. The couple started dating in early 2019. Neha changed her name after marriage, adding Bayas to her last name.

Career
Pendse started her career as a child actor and made her debut with the film Pyaar Koi Khel Nahin in 1999. She was later seen in films like Devdas. Pendse made her television debut with the show Captain House which was by Ekta Kapoor and Balaji Telefilms.

In 2016, she played the lead role of Sanjana in the Life OK popular comedy show May I Come In Madam? which went off air in 2017. She was a contestant on reality shows Comedy Dangal and Entertainment Ki Raat. In 2018, she was seen in the reality comedy game show Family Time With Kapil Sharma as the presenter opposite Kapil Sharma.

Pendse was a celebrity contestant in the twelfth season of the Indian version of the reality TV show Big Brother, Bigg Boss. She was evicted after 4 weeks on 14 October (Day 28).
In 2021 she replaced Saumya Tandon as Anita Vibhuti Narayan Mishra in the popular daily Sitcom Bhabiji Ghar Par Hain! Opposite Aasif Sheikh, Pendse Quit the show in January 2022 due to some unknown reasons

Media 
Pendse was ranked in The Times Most Desirable Women at No. 49 in 2019.

Filmography

Films

Television

See also 
 List of Hindi television actresses 
 List of Indian television actresses
 List of Indian film actresses

References

External links 

 
 

Living people
1984 births
Indian film actresses
Actresses in Marathi cinema
Actresses in Hindi cinema
21st-century Indian actresses
Indian television actresses
Actresses from Mumbai
Actresses in Marathi television
Bigg Boss (Hindi TV series) contestants
Fear Factor: Khatron Ke Khiladi participants
Actresses in Malayalam cinema
Actresses in Tamil cinema
Actresses in Telugu cinema
Actresses in Kannada cinema
Actresses in Hindi television